Governor Palmer may refer to:

Elwin Palmer (1852–1906), Governor of the National Bank of Egypt from 1898 to 1902
John M. Palmer (politician) (1817–1900), 15th Governor of Illinois
Richmond Palmer (1877–1958), Governor of The Gambia from 1930 to 1933 and Governor and of Cyprus from 1933 to 1939
William A. Palmer (1781–1860), 13th Governor of Vermont